Caravan is the debut album by the British Canterbury scene and progressive rock band Caravan. It was released by Verve Forecast in January 1969 and was the group's only album for the label.

Background
The album was the result of the band borrowing equipment from Soft Machine (who were touring the U.S. at the time with Jimi Hendrix and using his backline), producing "an unusually mature musical statement".  The album was released in stereo and mono, in both the United States and United Kingdom, but failed to reach chart hit status.

Track listing
All tracks credited to Sinclair, Hastings, Coughlan & Sinclair except where noted.

Side one

Side two

Re-release
The 2002 CD re-release included two full versions of the album, in its original mono and in stereo, and an extra track "Hello Hello" (3:12) which had originally been issued as a single.

Personnel
Caravan
 Pye Hastings – lead vocals (side 1: 1-2, 4), co-lead vocals (side 1: 5 & side 2: 1, 3), guitars, bass guitar
 Richard Sinclair – lead vocals (side 1: 3 & side 2: 2), co-lead vocals (side 1: 5 & side 2: 1, 3), bass guitar, guitar
 Dave Sinclair – Hammond organ, backing vocals
 Richard Coughlan – drums

Additional personnel
 Jimmy Hastings – flute on "Love Song with Flute"
 Tony Cox – production
 Keith Davis of DBWX – sleeve design

References

External links
 Official website
 Caravan album review by Lindsay Planer, credits & releases at AllMusic.com
 Caravan album releases & credits at Discogs.com

Caravan (band) albums
1968 debut albums
Decca Records albums
Verve Records albums